Jimmy "Spanky" DeBrest (April 24, 1937 in Philadelphia – March 2, 1973 in Philadelphia) was an American jazz bassist.

DeBrest played with Lee Morgan in his early years in Philadelphia. In 1957 he was a member of Ray Draper's Quintet, Jackie McLean, pianist Mal Waldron, and drummer Ben Dixon.

He played with Art Blakey's Jazz Messengers until 1958 which included Bill Hardman on trumpet and certain sessions with Thelonious Monk on piano. Other credits include work with John Coltrane, Clifford Jordan, Ray Draper, Lee Morgan, and J. J. Johnson. His last recordings were made in 1971.

Discography
With Art Blakey
 Hard Bop (Columbia, 1956)
 Originally (Columbia, 1956 [1982]) 
Ritual: The Modern Jazz Messengers (Pacific Jazz, 1957)
Drum Suite (Columbia, 1956)
Mirage (Savoy, 1957)
 Selections from Lerner and Loewe's... (Vik, 1957)
Tough! (Cadet, 1957 [1966])
A Night in Tunisia (Vik, 1957) - reissued as Theory of Art (Bluebird)
Cu-Bop (Jubilee, 1957)
Art Blakey's Jazz Messengers with Thelonious Monk (Atlantic, 1957) - with Thelonious Monk
 Hard Drive (Bethlehem, 1957)
With John Coltrane
Like Sonny (Capitol, 1960)
With Ray Draper
Tuba Sounds (Prestige, 1957)
The Ray Draper Quintet featuring John Coltrane (New Jazz, 1957) - with John Coltrane
A Tuba Jazz (Jubilee, 1958)
With J. J. Johnson
Really Livin' (Columbia, 1959)
With Clifford Jordan
Spellbound (Riverside, 1960)
With Harold Corbin
Soul Brother (Roulette – Birdland Series, 1960)
With Lee Morgan
We Remember You (Fresh Sound, 1991; recorded 1962)

References 

1937 births
1973 deaths
American jazz double-bassists
Male double-bassists
The Jazz Messengers members
Musicians from Philadelphia
20th-century American musicians
Jazz musicians from Pennsylvania
20th-century double-bassists
American male jazz musicians
20th-century American male musicians